The Allied invasion of Italy, a phase of the Mediterranean Theater of World War II, took place on 3 September at Reggio di Calabria (Operation Baytown), and on 9 September 1943 at Taranto and Salerno (Operation Slapstick and Operation Avalanche respectively). Allied naval forces landed American and Commonwealth troops on the beaches of southern Italy where they faced resistance from Axis forces.

Allied Forces 

Allied Forces Headquarters (AFHQ), Mediterranean
General Dwight D. Eisenhower
 Allied Naval Forces, Mediterranean (Admiral Andrew Cunningham)
 Western Task Force (Operation Avalanche) (Vice Admiral H. Kent Hewitt, USN)
 Force H (Vice Admiral Sir Algernon Willis, RN)
 Naval Task Force, Operation Slapstick (Vice Admiral Arthur Power, RN)
 Mediterranean Air Command (Allied) (Air Chief Marshal Sir Arthur Tedder)

Allied 15th Army Group
General Harold Alexander

Operation Baytown – 3 September 
Landings across Strait of Messina

British Eighth Army 

General Bernard Law Montgomery

British XIII Corps 
Lieutenant-General Sir Miles Dempsey
 British 5th Infantry Division (Major-General Gerard Bucknall)
 13th Infantry Brigade (Brigadier L.M. Campbell)
 2nd Battalion Cameronians (Scottish Rifles)
 2nd Battalion Royal Inniskilling Fusiliers
 2nd Battalion Wiltshire Regiment
 15th Infantry Brigade (Brigadier E.O. Martin)
 1st Battalion Green Howards
 1st Battalion King's Own Yorkshire Light Infantry
 1st Battalion, York and Lancaster Regiment
 17th Infantry Brigade (Brigadier Dudley Ward)
 2nd Battalion Royal Scots Fusiliers
 2nd Battalion Northamptonshire Regiment
 6th Battalion Seaforth Highlanders
 Divisional troops
 7th Battalion, Cheshire Regiment (Machine Gun Battalion)
 5th Reconnaissance Regiment, Reconnaissance Corps
 91st (4th London) Field Regiment, Royal Artillery
 92nd (5th London) Field Regiment, Royal Artillery
 156th (Lanarkshire Yeomanry) Field Regiment, Royal Artillery
 52nd (6th London) Anti-Tank Regiment, Royal Artillery
 18th Light Anti-Aircraft Regiment, Royal Artillery
 38th Field Company, Royal Engineers
 245th Field Company, Royal Engineers
 252nd Field Company, Royal Engineers
 254th Field Park Company, Royal Engineers
 Canadian 1st Infantry Division (Major-General Guy Simonds)
 1st Infantry Brigade (Brigadier Howard Graham)
 The Royal Canadian Regiment
 1st Battalion, The Hastings and Prince Edward Regiment
 1st Battalion, 48th Highlanders of Canada
 2nd Canadian Infantry Brigade (Brigadier Chris Vokes)
 Princess Patricia's Canadian Light Infantry
 1st Battalion, The Seaforth Highlanders of Canada
 1st Battalion, The Loyal Edmonton Regiment
 3rd Canadian Infantry Brigade (Brigadier M.H.S. Penhale)
 Royal 22e Régiment
 1st Battalion, The Carleton and York Regiment
 1st Battalion, The West Nova Scotia Regiment
 1st Canadian Armoured Brigade (Brigadier R.A. Wyman)
 11th Armoured Regiment (The Ontario Regiment)
 12th Armoured Regiment (Three Rivers Regiment)
 14th Armoured Regiment (The Calgary Regiment)
 Divisional troops
 4th Reconnaissance Regiment (4th Princess Louise Dragoon Guards)
 1st Infantry Division Support Battalion (The Saskatoon Light Infantry) (Machine Gun Battalion)
 1st Field Regiment, Royal Canadian Horse Artillery
 2nd Field Regiment, Royal Canadian Artillery
 3rd Field Regiment, Royal Canadian Artillery
 1st Anti-Tank Regiment, Royal Canadian Artillery
 1st Light Anti-Aircraft Regiment, Royal Canadian Artillery
 1st Field Company, Royal Canadian Engineers
 3rd Field Company, Royal Canadian Engineers
 4th Field Company, Royal Canadian Engineers
 2nd Field Park Company, Royal Canadian Engineers
 British 231st Infantry Brigade Group (Brigadier Roy Urquhart)
 2nd Battalion Devonshire Regiment
 1st Battalion Hampshire Regiment
 1st Battalion Dorsetshire Regiment
 165th Field Regiment, Royal Artillery
 295th Field Company, Royal Engineers
 Corps artillery
 6th Army Group, Royal Artillery
 2nd Anti-Aircraft Brigade
 Corps troops
 1st Special Reconnaissance Squadron
 No. 3 Commando
 No. 40 (Royal Marine) Commando
 Also supporting XIII Corps
 5th Army Group, Royal Artillery
 XXX Corps Artillery

Operation Slapstick – 9 September 
Landings at Taranto

British Eighth Army 
General Sir Bernard Law Montgomery

British 1st Airborne Division
 Major-General George F. Hopkinson; killed in action 9 September replaced by Major-General Ernest Down
 1st Parachute Brigade (Brigadier G.W. Lathbury)
 1st Parachute Battalion
 2nd Parachute Battalion
 3rd Parachute Battalion
 16th (Parachute) Field Ambulance
 2nd Parachute Brigade (Brigadier Ernest Down)
 4th Parachute Battalion
 5th Parachute Battalion
 6th Parachute Battalion
 127th (Parachute) Field Ambulance
 4th Parachute Brigade (Brigadier J.W. Hackett)
 10th Parachute Battalion
 11th Parachute Battalion
 156th Parachute Battalion
 133rd (Parachute) Field Ambulance
 1st Airlanding Brigade (Brigadier Pip Hicks)
 1st Battalion Border Regiment
 2nd Battalion South Staffordshire Regiment
 181st (Airlanding) Field Ambulance
 Glider Pilot Regiment

Operation Avalanche – 9 September 
Landings at Salerno

U.S. Fifth Army 

Lieutenant General Mark W. Clark

British X Corps 
Northern landing beaches
Lieutenant-General Richard L. McCreery
 46th Infantry Division (Major-General John Hawkesworth)
 128th (Hampshire) Infantry Brigade (Brigadier M.A. James)
 2nd Battalion, Hampshire Regiment
 1/4th Battalion, Hampshire Regiment
 5th Battalion, Hampshire Regiment
 138th Infantry Brigade (Brigadier G.P. Harding)
 6th Battalion, Lincolnshire Regiment
 2/4th Battalion, King's Own Yorkshire Light Infantry
 6th Battalion, York and Lancaster Regiment
 139th Infantry Brigade (Brigadier R.E.H. Stott)
 2/5th Battalion, Leicestershire Regiment
 5th Battalion, Sherwood Foresters
 16th Battalion, Durham Light Infantry
 Divisional Troops
 2nd Battalion, Royal Northumberland Fusiliers (Machine Gun Battalion)
 46th Reconnaissance Regiment, Reconnaissance Corps
 70th Field Regiment, Royal Artillery
 71st Field Regiment, Royal Artillery
 172nd Field Regiment, Royal Artillery
 58th Anti-Tank Regiment, Royal Artillery
 5th Medium Regiment, Royal Artillery
 115th Light Anti-Aircraft Regiment, Royal Artillery
 270th Field Company, Royal Engineers
 271st Field Company, Royal Engineers
 272nd Field Company, Royal Engineers
 273rd Field Park Company, Royal Engineers
 56th (London) Infantry Division (Major-General Douglas Graham)
 167th (London) Infantry Brigade (Brigadier C.E.A. Firth)
 8th Battalion, Royal Fusiliers
 9th Battalion, Royal Fusiliers
 7th Battalion, Oxfordshire and Buckinghamshire Light Infantry
 169th (London) Infantry Brigade (Brigadier L.O. Lyne)
 2/5th Battalion, Queen's Royal Regiment (West Surrey)
 2/6th Battalion, Queen's Royal Regiment (West Surrey)
 2/7th Battalion, Queen's Royal Regiment (West Surrey)
 201st Guards Brigade (Brigadier J.A. Gascoigne)
 6th Battalion, Grenadier Guards
 3rd Battalion, Coldstream Guards
 2nd Battalion, Scots Guards
 Divisional Troops
 6th Battalion, Cheshire Regiment (Machine Gun Battalion)
 44th Reconnaissance Regiment, Reconnaissance Corps
 64th Field Regiment, Royal Artillery
 65th Field Regiment, Royal Artillery
 113th Field Regiment, Royal Artillery
 67th Anti-Tank Regiment, Royal Artillery
 69th Medium Regiment, Royal Artillery
 57th Heavy Anti-Aircraft Regiment, Royal Artillery
 100th Light Anti-Aircraft Regiment, Royal Artillery
 220th Field Company, Royal Engineers
 221st Field Company, Royal Engineers
 42nd Field Company, Royal Engineers
 563rd Field Park Company, Royal Engineers
 British 7th Armoured Division (Major-General George Erskine)
 22nd Armoured Brigade (Brigadier W.R.N. Hinde)
 1st Royal Tank Regiment
 5th Royal Tank Regiment
 4th County of London Yeomanry (Sharpshooters)
 1st Battalion, Rifle Brigade (Prince Consort's Own)
 131st Infantry Brigade (Brigadier Lashmer Whistler)
 1/5th Battalion, Queen's Royal Regiment (West Surrey)
 1/6th Battalion, Queen's Royal Regiment (West Surrey)
 1/7th Battalion, Queen's Royal Regiment (West Surrey)
 Divisional Troops
 11th Hussars
 3rd Regiment, Royal Horse Artillery
 5th Regiment, Royal Horse Artillery
 146th Field Battery, Royal Artillery
 65th Anti-Tank Regiment, Royal Artillery
 15th Light Anti-Aircraft Regiment, Royal Artillery
 4th Field Squadron, Royal Engineers
 621st Field Squadron, Royal Engineers
 143rd Field Park Squadron, Royal Engineers
 Corps Troops
 Royal Scots Greys (Sherman tanks, attached to 56th Division)
 40th Royal Tank Regiment (attached to British 46th Infantry Division)
 British Special Service Brigade (Brigadier Robert Laycock)
 No. 2 (Army) Commando
 No. 41 (Royal Marine) Commando
 U.S. Ranger Force (Lieutenant Colonel William O. Darby)
 1st Ranger Battalion
 3rd Ranger Battalion
 4th Ranger Battalion

U.S. VI Corps 

 Southern landing beaches
 Major General Ernest J. Dawley
 U.S. 3rd Infantry "Rock of the Marne" Division (Major General Lucian K. Truscott)
 7th Infantry Regiment
 15th Infantry Regiment
 30th Infantry Regiment
 HHB  3rd DIVARTY
  9th Field Artillery Battalion
  10th Field Artillery Battalion
 39th Field Artillery Battalion
  41st Field Artillery Battalion
 3rd Reconnaissance Troop
  10th Engineer Combat Battalion
 3rd Medical Battalion 
 Headquarters, 3rd Special Troops
 HHC, 3rd Infantry Division 
 703rd Ordnance Light Maintenance Company 
 3rd Signal Company 
 3rd Quartermaster Company
 U.S. 34th Infantry "Red Bull" Division (Major General Charles W. Ryder)
 133rd Infantry Regiment
 135th Infantry Regiment
 168th Infantry Regiment
 U.S. 36th Infantry "Arrowhead" Division (Major General Fred L. Walker)
 141st Infantry Regiment
 142nd Infantry Regiment
 143rd Infantry Regiment
 U.S. 45th Infantry "Thunderbird" Division (Major General Troy H. Middleton)
 157th Infantry Regiment
 179th Infantry Regiment
 180th Infantry Regiment

Army Group Reserve 
These units were available to Fifth Army
 U.S. 82nd Airborne "All-American" Division (Major General Matthew B. Ridgway)
 504th Parachute Infantry Regiment
 505th Parachute Infantry Regiment
 325th Glider Infantry Regiment
 U.S. 1st Armored "Old Ironsides" Division (Major General Ernest N. Harmon)

German Forces

Army Command South 

Generalfeldmarschall Albert Kesselring

Armeeoberkommando (AOK) 10 
Generaloberst Heinrich von Vietinghoff

XIV Panzer Corps
General der Panzertruppen Hermann Balck
Deployed along coast from north to south of Naples:
 15th Panzergrenadier Division (Generalleutnant Eberhard Rodt)
 Kampfgruppe Stroh
 Panzer Division Hermann Göring (Generalmajor Wilhelm Schmalz)
 Kampfgruppe Haas
 Kampfgruppe Becker
 16th Panzer Division (Generalleutnant Rudolf Sieckenius)
 Kampfgruppe Dörnemann
 Kampfgruppe Stempel
 Kampfgruppe von Holtey
 Kampfgruppe von Doering

LXXVI Panzer Corps
General der Panzertruppen Traugott Herr
Deployed in Calabria and Apulia:
 26th Panzer Division (Generalleutnant Smilo Freiherr von Lüttwitz)
 Kampfgruppe
 3rd Panzergrenadier Division (Generalleutnant Fritz-Hubert Gräser)
 Kampfgruppe Moldenhaur
 29th Panzergrenadier Division (Generalleutnant Walter Fries)
 Kampfgruppe Ulich
 Kampfgruppe Krüger

Notes

Citations

Bibliography

Print

Web 
 
 

World War II orders of battle
World War II operations and battles of the Italian Campaign
Italian campaign (World War II)
Allied invasion of Sicily